The 1962 Prince Edward Island general election was held in the Canadian province of Prince Edward Island on December 10, 1962.

The governing Progressive Conservatives of Premier Walter R. Shaw won re-election with a majority government over the opposition Liberals, led by former Premier Alex W. Matheson.

Party Standings

Members Elected

The Legislature of Prince Edward Island had two levels of membership from 1893 to 1996 - Assemblymen and Councillors. This was a holdover from when the Island had a bicameral legislature, the General Assembly and the Legislative Council.

In 1893, the Legislative Council was abolished and had its membership merged with the Assembly, though the two titles remained separate and were elected by different electoral franchises. Assembleymen were elected by all eligible voters of within a district, while Councillors were only elected by landowners within a district. This landowner requirement would be abolished before the next election

Kings

Queens

Prince

Sources

Further reading
 

1962 elections in Canada
Elections in Prince Edward Island
1962 in Prince Edward Island
December 1962 events in Canada